The 2017 basketball tournaments of the National Collegiate Athletic Association, otherwise known as the NCAA Season 93, which started on July 8, 2017 at Mall of Asia Arena, Pasay. Same as the last year's opener, the defending champions San Beda Red Lions will open their title defense bid as they will battle the season's hosts San Sebastian Stags at the first game, and at the second game the Arellano Chiefs will open their first season without Jio Jalalon as they take on the Mapúa Cardinals.

ABS-CBN Sports and Action will be covering the games for the third consecutive year.

Format 
 In the seniors and juniors' tournament, ten (10) teams will play in a double round-robin classification.
 Once teams are tied, tie-breaker games shall be held for either the first, second or the fourth seed if necessary.
 The scenarios after the elimination round ends are the following below:
  1. If no team sweeps the elimination round, the regular play-offs (Final Four) shall be used.
  2. If a team successfully sweep the elimination round, that team will gain an automatic bye to the finals and the stepladder play-offs shall be used.
In the semifinals, the first and second seed shall earn a twice-to-beat bonus against their respective opponents. These teams shall only need to win once to advance to the finals; while the third and fourth seed teams will need to win twice to advance to the finals.
The finals is a best-of-three championship series.

Teams

Seniors' tournament

Elimination round

Team standings

Match-up results

Scores

Fourth–seed playoffs
 As three teams were tied for #4, the two teams with the lowest head-to-head goal averages (Arellano and Letran) played in the first round of the fourth-seed playoff. The winner met San Sebastian for the right to enter the playoffs proper.

Qualification playoff

Fourth-seed playoff

Bracket

Stepladder semifinals
This stage is a single-elimination tournament.

First round 
This is the first playoff appearance for JRU since 2015, and the first for San Sebastian since 2013.

Second round
This is the 12th consecutive playoff appearance of defending champions San Beda.

Finals
This is a best-of-three playoff. This is the first Finals appearance for Lyceum, and the 12th consecutive Finals appearance for San Beda. Lyceum's sweep of the elimination round broke San Beda's 11-year streak of being the #1 seed, and is the first sweep since San Beda did it in 2010.

 Finals Most Valuable Player:

All-Star Game 
The Games of the NCAA All-Star were held last September 1 at the Filoil Flying V Center in San Juan. The event served as a transition event from the first round going into the second round. The Team Saints, composed of stars from Perpetual Help, San Beda, Letran, Benilde, and the season hosts, San Sebastian, defeated The Team Heroes, consisting of Arellano, Lyceum, Jose Rizal University, Emilio Aguinaldo College, and Mapua; 84–80. Prince Eze was named as the All-Star MVP who went double-double with 17 points, 14 rebounds, and 3 blocks.

All-Star Game MVP: Prince Eze (Team Saints)

Controversies

Wrong uniform
On July 11, 2017, The Altas were clad in maroon when they were scheduled to be donning their light uniforms. Hence, the league ruled that the University of Perpetual Help was ineligible to play in its matchup against the Blazers earlier in the day. Citing the rule which states, “any athlete whose playing uniform does not conform with the rules will be ineligible to participate in a given game/match”, the management committee overturned UPHSD's 69-65 win in favor of the Blazers.

Awards

 Most Valuable Player:  
 Rookie of the Year:  
 Mythical Five:
  
  
 
  
 
 Defensive Player of the Year:  
 All-Defensive Team:
  
  
 
 
 
 Most Improved Player:

Statistics

Season average leaders

Juniors' tournament

Elimination round

Team standings

Match-up results

Scores

Fourth-seed playoff

Bracket 
*Game went into overtime

Semifinals 
San Beda and Malayan have the twice-to-beat advantage; they only need to win once, while their opponents twice, to advance to the finals.

San Beda vs. LSGH

Malayan vs. Letran

Finals 

 Finals Most Valuable Player:

Awards 

 Most Valuable Player: 
 Rookie of the Year: 
 Defensive Player of the Year: 
 Most Improved Player: co-awardees, 
 Mythical Five:
 
 
 
 
 
 All-Defensive Team:

Controversies

Wrong uniform
On July 11, 2017, The Junior Altas wore their dark uniforms instead of light. The Juniors' standings did not change, however, as CSB-LSGH triumphed in that matchup.

See also 
 UAAP Season 80 basketball tournaments

References

External links
Official website

93
2017–18 in Philippine college basketball